Heidelberg Commando was a light infantry regiment of the South African Army. It formed part of the South African Army Infantry Formation as well as the South African Territorial Reserve.

History

Origin
Heidelberg Commando was formed in 1851 and was one of the oldest SADF units. One of its most iconic commanders was General Christiaan de Wet who farmed near Heidelberg.

Operations

With the Zuid Afrikaanse Republiek
During the Anglo Boer war this commando was known to have been commanded by a general at three different times. Heidelberg Commando served in the Natal Campaign and took part in the Battles of Modderspruit, Colenso, Platrand and Spioenkop.

By January 1902 the unit was forced in the Free State and joined up with Frankfort Commando.

The Commando was sent to assist the Free Staters at Paardeberg where General Piet Cronje and his laager was trapped.  The Heidelbergers were then under the command of Commandant Cornelis Spruyt.

With the UDF
By 1902 all Commando remnants were under British military control and disarmed.

By 1912, however previous Commando members could join shooting associations.

By 1940, such commandos were under control of the National Reserve of Volunteers.

These commandos were formally reactivated by 1948.

1922 Miners Strike
At 05:00 on 12 March 1922, the Union Defence Force (UDF) attacked Benoni. The objectives was to defeat striking commandos at a steel factory and then move into the rest of the town. The Government forces commenced their attack at 11:00 and immediately came under heavy fire. The attack on the steel factory was supported by artillery fire from two positions, which contributed to the striker commandos being dislodged. The attack then continued along Main Reef Road. Commandant. P. Botha and a portion of the Standerton East Commando joined the fight at 16:00.  The attack was called off at 17:00 in order to reorganize and consolidate positions before dark.  Ammunition and arms arrived later that night and was distributed. The reinforcements consisted of the rest of the Standerton East Commando, the Blesbokspruit Commando (Standerton), the Heidelberg Commando, the Hoogveld Commando (Heidelberg), the Roodekoppe Commando (Standerton), and the Standerton West Commando. The attack continued on 13 March.  The operation went according to plan and the besieged police and Permanent Force was relieved. An instruction was subsequently issued to arrest all male residents of Benoni.

With the SADF
During this era, the commando was mainly tasked with area force protection, search and cordones and stock theft control assistance to the local police.

Colours
On 8 September 1990 the unit was awarded a new colours by the General Officer Commanding Witwatersrand, Major General W.G. Kritzinger. A new regimental badge was worn for the first tim. A castle surmounted by an eagle of the old South African republic to symbolize that at one time Heidelberg was the capital of the republic. The old badge of a "kranzitter" would no longer be used .

With the SANDF

Amalgamation
Nigel Commando amalgamated with Heidelberg Commando on 1 April 1997.

Disbandment
This unit, along with all other Commando units was disbanded after a decision by South African President Thabo Mbeki to disband all Commando Units. The Commando system was phased out between 2003 and 2008 "because of the role it played in the apartheid era", according to the Minister of Safety and Security Charles Nqakula.

Unit Insignia

Leadership

References

See also 
 South African Commando System

Infantry regiments of South Africa
South African Commando Units
Military units and formations of the Second Boer War